"Lotus" is the 26th single by Japanese band Dir En Grey, released on January 26, 2011 in Japan in a regular and limited edition, the limited copy featuring a bonus DVD.

The first B-side, "Obscure", is a re-recording of a track from band's fourth album, Vulgar. The second B-side is a live recording of the song "Reiketsu Nariseba", from the band's seventh album, Uroboros, recorded on July 20, 2010, at Shinkiba Studio Coast. The DVD included in the limited edition features three live songs taken from a concert held by the band on the following day.

Track listing

CD

DVD

Chart position

References

2011 singles
Dir En Grey songs
Songs written by Kyo (musician)
2010 songs